The PNS Zafar, or Naval Base Zafar is a naval base located in the vicinity of the Navy NHQ in Islamabad, Pakistan. Commissioned in 1974, it serves as a headquarter of the Northern Command of the Pakistan Navy.

References

External links
Administration Authority

Pakistan Navy bases
Military logistics of Pakistan
Military installations in Khyber Pakhtunkhwa
Military in Gilgit-Baltistan